Sirius FM-5, also known as Radiosat 5, is an American communications satellite which is operated by Sirius XM Radio. It was constructed by Space Systems Loral, based on the LS-1300 bus, and carries a single transponder designed to transmit in the NATO E, F and I bands (IEEE S and X bands). It is currently being used to provide satellite radio broadcasting to North America.

Sirius FM-5 was launched by a Proton-M/Briz-M rocket flying from Site 200/39 at the Baikonur Cosmodrome. The launch was conducted by International Launch Services, and occurred at 19:10 GMT on 30 June 2009. Around nine hours after launch, the satellite separated from the carrier rocket into a geosynchronous transfer orbit. It will raise itself into geostationary orbit by means of its onboard R-4D apogee motor. It also carries four SPT-100 engines for manoeuvring.

It is the first Sirius Radio satellite to be placed in geostationary orbit; the three previous Sirius satellites operate in tundra orbits (and the fourth satellite, Sirius FM-4, was a ground spare that was never launched into space). Originally placed at 96° west, it was moved to 86.2° west alongside XM-5.

See also

Sirius FM-1
Sirius FM-2
Sirius FM-3

References

Spacecraft launched in 2009
Sirius XM